Highway 21 is a cross-border spur in the Regional District of Central Kootenay in British Columbia.  First opened in 1964, the highway travels 14 km (9 mi) northwest along the Kootenay River from its connection with Idaho State Highway 1 at the Rykerts Canada-U.S. border crossing to a point on the Crowsnest Highway (Highway 3) just 1 km (about ½ mi) west of Creston.

Approximately 4 km (2 mi) from its northbound terminus, Highway 21 comes to an intersection with Erickson Street as it enters Creston. At this point, motorists intending to travel eastbound on the Crowsnest Highway toward Cranbrook and the Alberta border can bypass Creston's main business district and connect to the Crowsnest at Erickson. Westbound motorists can continue on Highway 21 to its northern terminus.

References

021